Lliswerry High School is a secondary school in Newport, Wales.

References

External links 
 

Secondary schools in Newport, Wales